Pink Box: Inside Japan's Sex Clubs is a book by photojournalist Joan Sinclair, chronicling her exploration of the secret world of fuzoku (prostitution) in Japan.
Sinclair was joined by contributor James Farrer, a sociologist, who attempted to "place[s] the images in the context of contemporary Japanese culture".

Sinclair, a lawyer, describes being triggered to write the book by a comment she overheard ten years earlier, when she spent a year teaching English in Japan.
Sinclair describes encountering and overcoming difficulties researching and gaining access to the clubs, usually reserved for Japanese-born patrons.

References

Further reading

External links
 

2006 non-fiction books
Photographic collections and books
Photography in Japan
Sexuality in Japan
Books about Japanese prostitution